Dorcadion ingeae is a species of beetle in the family Cerambycidae. It was described by Peks in 1993. It is known from Turkey.

See also 
Dorcadion

References

ingeae
Beetles described in 1993